Anela Choy is an American biological oceanographer, who is assistant professor at Scripps Institution of Oceanography, University of California, San Diego. She is most noted for her discovery that the stomachs of deep sea fish (living at an average depth of ) contain bottle caps, trash bags, and microplastics. She also led a team that designed a remote-operated device that was released in Monterey Bay to track pollution of microplastics. A native Hawaiian, she is a member of the Society for Advancement of Chicanos/Hispanics and Native Americans in Science (SACNAS) and vocal advocate for women in science.

Awards and recognition
In 2018 she won the L’Oréal-UNESCO for Women in Science Award for her work, which focuses on how human activity, such as fishing and plastic pollution, shapes deep ocean food webs.

In 2021, Choy was awarded a Sloan Fellowship as an early career researcher.

References

Year of birth missing (living people)
Living people
21st-century American women
American oceanographers
American women scientists
Women oceanographers